Cheng County or Chengxian is a county under the administration of Longnan City, in southeastern Gansu Province of China. It has a land area of 1,780 square kilometers and a population of 250,000 in 2004. The postal code is 742500, and the county seat is located in Chengguan Town.

Located between mountains, it has a temperate climate, favourable for agriculture. The mountains have lead and zinc ore deposits.

Chengxian is noted for its walnut production. Chengxian walnuts were designated a protected origin product in China in 2014.

In January 2021, the Qingni River in Chengxian was found to be polluted with thallium from zinc production wastewater.

Administrative divisions
Cheng County is divided to 14 towns and 3 townships.
Towns

- Towns are upgraded from Township.

Townships

-Former Townships are merged to other.

Climate

Transportation
Longnan Chengzhou Airport opened in 2018 and offers domestic flights. The Tianshui–Longnan railway started construction in 2020 and will be the first railway to serve the county.

China National Highway 567 and G7011 Shiyan–Tianshui Expressway are the main roads connecting the county.

References

County-level divisions of Gansu
Longnan